Awo-Idemili is the headquarters of Orsu Local Government, Imo State in southeastern Nigeria. It is located near the city of Orlu.

The former Imo state Governor, chief Achike Udenwa announced the creation of the autonomous community. Awo-Idemili broke into five autonomous communities:
 ISIAMA autonomous community.
 OKWU-AMARAIHE autonomous community.
 OKWU-FURUAKU autonomous community.

 ETITI autonomous community.
 AWO-IDEMILI autonomous community
Isiama autonomous community has Isieke and Amaimo. 

Okwu-Amaraihe autonomous community has Ezeogwu, Ubahaeze, Obibi and Amadi. Okwu-furuaku autonomous community has Ahaba, Ohukabia, Amaokwu and Ubahaezedeke. Okwu-Etitio broke into three autonomous communities: - Etiti autonomous community has Edenta and Ubahaezike, while Ede the only remaining village in Okwu-Etiti becomes Awo-Idemili autonomous community. The five autonomous communities have their own traditional rulers. They are using the elected council system on rotatory method, starting from the oldest village in their communities to select traditional ruler.

References

https://web.archive.org/web/20110201110611/http://awoidemili.com/
http://www.awo-okukoro.com/node/4

Towns in Imo State